Several ships have been named Barrosa (or Barrossa, or Barossa, or Barosa), for the Battle of Barrosa (5 March 1811): 

 was launched at Cossipore. She sailed to England and then made six voyages for the British East India Company (EIC). After the EIC gave up its maritime activities in 1833-1834, Barossa became a transport. She made three voyages transporting convicts to Australia. She was lost in 1847.
Barossa was an iron clipper of 1019 GRT/968 NRT launched at Sunderland in 1873 for T.B. White.

See also
 - one of four vessels of the Royal Navy by that name

Ship names